Kim Young-geun (born October 12, 1978) is a South Korean football player. His previous clubs were Daejeon Citizen, Gwangju Sangmu, Gyeongnam FC.

References

1978 births
Living people
South Korean footballers
K League 1 players
Daejeon Hana Citizen FC players
Gimcheon Sangmu FC players
Gyeongnam FC players
Association football defenders